Joseph Jardine (1822 - 1861) was a taipan of the Jardine Matheson & Co. and member of the Legislative Council of Hong Kong.

Joseph was the nephew of Dr. William Jardine, founder of the Jardine Matheson & Co., and younger brother of David Jardine. He followed the family tradition by going to China in 1843 and being given a partnership in Jardine Matheson & Co. He succeeded his elder brother David, becoming taipan of the trading firm and unofficial member of the Legislative Council after David's death in 1856.

He retired in 1860 at the age of 38 and died next year at Castlemilk, an estate bought for him by his brother.

See also
Family tree of William Jardine (1784-1843)

References

Jardine Matheson Group
Members of the Legislative Council of Hong Kong
Hong Kong people of Scottish descent
1822 births
1861 deaths
19th-century Scottish businesspeople